Cola urceolata, also known as bemange, bokosa, eboli, egwasa, ikaie, lekukumu, lungandu, lusakani, matadohohu, nesunguna, ngbilimo, ngono, and zimonziele, is a flowering shrub in the family Malvaceae.

Distribution
Cola urceolata is native to central Africa, from Cameroon south to Gabon and east to the Democratic Republic of the Congo, as well as eastern Central African Republic.

Description
Cola urceolata is an evergreen shrub that grows to 3 meters (9.8 feet) in height. The dark green leaves are elliptical in shape and the flowers are yellow to white and three-petaled. The fruit somewhat resembles a pepper in shape, and is red when ripe and green when unripe. It is curved and tapers to a point towards its non-stem end. They grow in clusters, normally of three. The fruit, seeds, flowers, and leaves are edible.

Uses
The fruits and other edible parts of the plant are eaten raw or cooked in its native range.

See also
List of culinary fruits

References

urceolata
Fruit trees
Taxa named by Karl Moritz Schumann
Flora of the Democratic Republic of the Congo
Flora of the Republic of the Congo
Flora of the Central African Republic
Flora of Cameroon
Flora of Gabon
Plants described in 1900